Atchison, Topeka and Santa Fe Passenger Depot or Santa Fe Station in Colorado Springs, Colorado is a historic railway station. The grand depot and Harvey House was built in 1917 as a joint Santa Fe/Colorado and Southern Railway facility. In 1972, the Santa Fe tracks through Colorado Springs were removed and rail operations were consolidated on the former Rio Grande trackage on the west side of town. The depot and the nearby express building (later used as a freight house) now serves as Catalyst Campus for Technology and Innovation.

The depot was listed on the National Register of Historic Places in 1979.  It was deemed "significant for its architectural features and for the role it played in rail transportation in Colorado."

See also
National Register of Historic Places listings in El Paso County, Colorado

References

External links

National Register of Historic Places
Colorado Springs Station (Surviving Santa Fe Depots)

Tudor Revival architecture in Colorado
Railway stations in the United States opened in 1917
Colorado Springs
Former railway stations in Colorado
Buildings and structures in Colorado Springs, Colorado
Transportation in Colorado Springs, Colorado
Railway stations on the National Register of Historic Places in Colorado
National Register of Historic Places in Colorado Springs, Colorado
Transportation buildings and structures in El Paso County, Colorado

1917 establishments in Colorado